Kaghazkonan District is in Mianeh County, East Azerbaijan province, Iran. At the 2006 National Census, its population was 11,101 in 3,241 households. The following census in 2011 counted 9,366 people in 3,214 households. At the latest census in 2016, the district had 10,729 inhabitants in 3,785 households.

References 

Meyaneh County

Districts of East Azerbaijan Province

Populated places in East Azerbaijan Province

Populated places in Meyaneh County